Free may refer to:

Concept 
 Freedom, having the ability to do something, without having to obey anyone/anything
 Freethought, a position that beliefs should be formed only on the basis of logic, reason, and empiricism
 Emancipate, to procure political rights, as for a disenfranchised group
 Free will, control exercised by rational agents over their actions and decisions
 Free of charge, also known as gratis. See Gratis vs libre.

Computing 

 Free (programming), a function that releases dynamically allocated memory for reuse
 Free format, a file format which can be used without restrictions
 Free software, software usable and distributable with few restrictions and no payment
 Freeware, a broader class of software available at no cost

Mathematics 
 Free object
 Free abelian group
 Free algebra
 Free group
 Free module
 Free semigroup
 Free variable

People 
 Free (surname)
 Free (rapper) (born 1968), or Free Marie, American rapper and media personality
 Free, a pseudonym for the activist and writer Abbie Hoffman
 Free (active 2003–), American musician in the band FreeSol

Arts and media

Film and television
 Free (film), a 2001 American dramedy
 Free!, a Japanese anime series starting in 2013
 "Free" (Desperate Housewives), a television episode

Music

Bands and groups
 Free (band), an English rock band 1968–1973
 Free!!, a Spanish mákina band 1994–2004
 The Free, a German eurodance band 1994–1999
 Have Heart, re-formed as Free since 2009, an American straight edge band

Albums
 Free (Airto album) or the title song, 1972
 Free (Benny Golson album), 1963
 Free (Bonfire album) or the title song, 2003
 Free (Brad Johner album) or the title song, 2003
 Free (Chico DeBarge album) or the title song, 2003
 Free (Cody Simpson album) or the title song, 2015
 Free (Concrete Blonde album), 1989
 Free (Dana International album) or the title song, 1999
 Free (David Garrett album), 2007
 Free (Gavin DeGraw album) or the title song, 2009
 Free (For Real album) or the title song, 1996
 Free (Free album), 1969
 Free (Iggy Pop album) or the title song, 2019
 Free (Kate Ryan album) or the title song, 2008
 Free (Jann Arden album) or the title song, 2009
 Free (Kierra Sheard album) or the title song, 2011
 Free (Lisa Shaw album) or the title song, 2009
 Free (Mao Abe album) or the title song (see below), 2009
 Free (Marcus Miller album), 2007
 Free (Negativland album), 1993
 Free (OSI album) or the title song, 2006
 Free (The Party album) or the title song, 1992
 Free (Prince Markie Dee album) or the title song, 1992
 Free (Rick Astley album), 1991
 Free (Rivermaya album), 2000
 Free (Twin Atlantic album) or the title song, 2011
 Free (Virtue album) or the title song, 2003
 Free... (EP), by Acid King, or the title song, 2001
 Free (Based Freestyles Mixtape), by Lil B and Chance the Rapper, 2015
 Free, by Hundredth, 2015
 free*, by Jim's Big Ego, 2008
 Free, by Libera, 2004
 Free, by Planetshakers, 2008
 Free, by Stone, 1992

Songs
 "Free" (Broods song), 2016
 "Free" (Chicago song), 1971
 "Free" (Dara Maclean song), 2011
 "Free" (Deniece Williams song), 1976
 "Free" (Erika song), 2007
 "Free" (Estelle song), 2004
 "Free" (Haley Reinhart song), 2012
 "Free" (Mao Abe song), 2008
 "Free" (Mýa song), 2001
 "Free" (Natalia Kills song), 2011
 "Free" (Pete Murray song), 2011
 "Free" (Phish song), 1996
 "Free" (Rudimental song), 2013
 "Free" (Sarah Brightman song), 2003
 "Free" (Train song), 1998
 "Free" (Ultra Naté song), 1997
 "Free" (Zac Brown Band song), 2010
 "Free", by Alesha Dixon from Fired Up, 2006
 "Free", by Bacon Popper, 1998
 "Free", by Blue October UK from One Day Silver, One Day Gold, 2005
 "Free", by the Cars from Move Like This, 2011
 "Free", by Cat Power from You Are Free, 2003
 "Free", by Charlie Puth, 2020
 "Free", by Dani Harmer, the theme from Dani's House, 2008
 "Free", by Depeche Mode, B-side of "Precious", 2005
 "Free", by Destiny's Child from Destiny Fulfilled, 2004
 "Free", by DJ Quicksilver, 1997
 "Free", by Donna De Lory from Bliss, 2000
 "Free", by Enrique Iglesias from 7, 2003
 "Free", by Ginny Owens from Without Condition, 1999
 "Free", by Graffiti6 from Colours, 2010
 "Free", by H.E.R. from H.E.R., 2017
 "Free", by Jeremy Camp from Reckless, 2013
 "Free", by Jon Secada, 2006
 "Free", by Little Big Town from The Breaker, 2017
 "Free", by Louis the Child from Here for Now, 2020
 "Free", by the Martinis from Empire Records: The Soundtrack, 1995
 "Free", by Michelle Williams from Journey to Freedom, 2014
 "Free", by Mikolas Josef, 2016
 "Free", by Nakatomi, 1995
 "Free", by Parcels, 2021
 "Free", by Pink from Try This, 2003
 "Free", by Plumb from Beautiful Lumps of Coal, 2003
 "Free", by Powerman 5000 from Transform, 2003
 "Free", by Primal Scream from Give Out But Don't Give Up, 1994
 "Free", by Prince from 1999, 1982
 "Free", by Quiet Riot from Rehab, 2006
 "Free", by Stephanie Mills from Born for This!, 2004
 "Free", by Stevie Wonder from Characters, 1987
 "Free", by Stryper from To Hell with the Devil, 1986
 "Free", by VAST from Music for People, 2000
 "Free", by Why Don't We, 2016
 "Free", by Will Downing, 1988
 "Free", by Yu Yamada, the ending theme for the anime Basquash!, 2009
 "Free", written by Irving Berlin

Other media
 Free (Anderson book), a 2009 economics book by Chris Anderson
 Free (Ypi book), a 2021 memoir by Lea Ypi
 Free (Soul Eater), a character from the manga and anime Soul Eater

Organizations 
 Fight Repression of Erotic Expression, a University of Minnesota student group, now the Queer Student Cultural Center
 Foundation for Rational Economics and Education, a libertarian think tank founded by Ron Paul
 Foundation for Research on Economics and the Environment, a think tank that promotes free-market environmentalism
 Free (ISP), a French internet service provider
 Free Airlines, a Kinshasa Congolese air operator

Other
 Free (cigarette), from Brazil
 Free, Indiana, USA; an unincorporated community
 Free content, material without significant legal usability restrictions
 Voyah Free, an electric car

See also 

 
 Freestyle (disambiguation)
 Freedom (disambiguation)
 Freed (disambiguation)
 Freeman (disambiguation)